Matt Walker (born April 7, 1980) is a Canadian former professional ice hockey defenceman who played in the National Hockey League (NHL). During his nine NHL seasons he played for the St. Louis Blues, Chicago Blackhawks, Tampa Bay Lightning, and Philadelphia Flyers. He is the younger brother of former WHL player Darby Walker and cousin of former AHL goaltender Mike Walker, and Olympic bronze medallist curler Geoff Walker.

Playing career
Walker was drafted by the St. Louis Blues in the 3rd round of the 1998 NHL Entry Draft, 83rd overall. He spent the first ten years of his professional career with both the Blues and their American Hockey League affiliates, the Worcester IceCats and the Peoria Rivermen. After having played 153 games in the league, he finally notched his first NHL goal on February 17, 2008 while the Blues were hosting the Columbus Blue Jackets.

On July 1, 2009, he signed a four-year, $6.8 million deal with the Tampa Bay Lightning. On July 19, 2010, Walker was traded to the Philadelphia Flyers, along with a 4th-round pick in the 2011 NHL Entry Draft, in exchange for forward Simon Gagne.

Walker's three years in Philadelphia were marred by hip and back injuries, playing in only eight games with the Flyers and 44 games with the Flyers' AHL affiliate, the Adirondack Phantoms. He missed the entire  season due to a back injury.

Post retirement
In 2014, Walker moved to Nelson, British Columbia and bought the Nelson Brewing Company with his wife in 2016.

Career statistics

References

External links
 

1980 births
Adirondack Phantoms players
Canadian ice hockey defencemen
Chicago Blackhawks players
Ice hockey people from Alberta
Kootenay Ice players
Living people
Peoria Rivermen (AHL) players
Peoria Rivermen (ECHL) players
Philadelphia Flyers players
Portland Winterhawks players
St. Louis Blues draft picks
St. Louis Blues players
Tampa Bay Lightning players
Worcester IceCats players